Crater Peak  may refer to one of the following:

One of eight mountain peaks in the United States:
Crater Peak (Alaska)
Crater Peak (California)
Crater Peak (Colorado), summit of the Grand Mesa
Crater Peak (Shoshone County, Idaho)
Crater Peak (Valley County, Idaho)
Crater Peak (New Mexico)
Crater Peak (Oregon)
Crater Peak (Washington)